Mount Darbyshire is a prominent bare rock mountain  high, which stands close west of the Warren Range in Victoria Land. It was mapped by the United States Geological Survey from surveys and from U.S. Navy aerial photographs, 1956–61, and named by the Advisory Committee on Antarctic Names for Major Leslie L. Darbyshire, United States Marine Corps, a pilot with U.S. Navy Squadron VX-6, 1960–61 and 1961–62.

References
 

Mountains of Oates Land